Dongsheng Subdistrict is a subdistrict of Yichun District, in the eastern outskirts of the city of Yichun, Heilongjiang, People's Republic of China. , it has 3 residential communities and 4 villages under its administration.

See also 
 List of township-level divisions of Heilongjiang

References 

Township-level divisions of Heilongjiang